Isabella Cannuscio (born December 29, 1990 in Philadelphia) is an American former competitive ice dancer. With Ian Lorello, she is the 2011 Ice Challenge silver medalist and the 2010 U.S. national junior pewter medalist. They competed at three Grand Prix events and won two bronze medals on the ISU Junior Grand Prix series. They announced the end of their partnership in March 2012. Cannuscio then competed for two seasons with Michael Bramante.

Early in her career, Cannuscio skated with Kyle Herring. From 2005–2006, she competed with Zachary Varraux.

She is the sister of American ice dancer Anastasia Cannuscio and married her sister's partner, Colin McManus, on May 27, 2018. On November 27, 2021, the couple announced they were expecting their first child, a boy, due in May 2022. She gave birth to Finn James McManus on May 16, 2022.

Programs 
(with Lorello)

Competitive highlights 
GP: Grand Prix; JGP: Junior Grand Prix

With Bramante

With Lorello

With Varraux

References

External links 

 
 Official website of Isabella Cannuscio / Ian Lorello at ice-dance.com

American female ice dancers
1990 births
Living people
Sportspeople from Philadelphia
People from Bear, Delaware
Dancers from Delaware
Dancers from Pennsylvania
21st-century American women